The black-capped foliage-gleaner (Philydor atricapillus) is a species of bird in the ovenbird family Furnariidae. The species is very closely related to the Alagoas foliage-gleaner and forms a superspecies with it.
It is found in eastern Brazil, eastern Paraguay and far northeastern Argentina.

It has striking plumage for a foliage-gleaner, with a mostly rufous body and a black cap, and black and buff stripes through the eyes. The sexes are alike.

It feeds on arthropods, preferring caterpillars and to a lesser extent beetles, but also takes flies, spiders, grasshoppers, true bugs, centipedes, and cockroaches. It feeds singly, in pairs or in mixed species feeding-flocks, and takes prey from dead leaves from the forest-floor to the canopy. Almost nothing is known about its breeding behaviour, beyond its nest being reported to being in a hole in a dirt bank.

The species is not considered threatened. Its range has decreased due to deforestation, but it is able to persist in small fragments of habitat.

References

black-capped foliage-gleaner
Birds of Brazil
Birds of the Atlantic Forest
black-capped foliage-gleaner
Taxonomy articles created by Polbot